Krutets is a rural locality (a khutor) in Volchanskoye Rural Settlement, Kamensky District, Voronezh Oblast, Russia. The population was 398 as of 2010. There are 6 streets.

Geography 
Krutets is located 30 km north of Kamenka (the district's administrative centre) by road. Rybalchino is the nearest rural locality.

References 

Rural localities in Kamensky District, Voronezh Oblast